Saint Paul Island is the largest of the Pribilof Islands, a group of four Alaskan volcanic islands located in the Bering Sea between the United States and Russia. The city of St. Paul is the only residential area on the island. The three nearest islands to Saint Paul Island are Otter Island to the southwest, Saint George slightly to the south, and Walrus Island to the east.

St. Paul Island currently has one school (K-12, 76 students), one post office, one bar, one small store, and one church (the Russian Orthodox Sts. Peter and Paul Church), which is listed on the U.S. National Register of Historic Places.

Geography and geology

Saint Paul is the largest of the Pribilof Islands and lies the farthest north. Volcanic in origin, Saint Paul features a number of cinder cones and volcanic craters in its interior. Most of the island is a low-lying mix of rocky plateaus and valleys, with some of the valleys holding freshwater ponds. Much of its  of shoreline is rugged and rocky, rising to sheer cliffs at several headlands, though long sandy beaches backed by shifting sand dunes flank a number of shallow bays.

Like the other Pribilof Islands, Saint Paul rises from a basaltic base. Its hills are primarily brown or red tufa and cinder heaps, though some (like Polavina) are composed of red scoria and breccia. 
The island sits on the southern edge of the Bering-Chukchi platform, and may have been part of the Bering Land Bridge's southern coastline when the last ice age's glaciers reached their maximum expansion. Sediment core samples taken on Saint Paul show that tundra vegetation similar to that found on the island today has been present for at least 9,000 years. The thick rough turf is dominated by umbellifers (particularly Angelica) and Artemisia, though grasses and sedges are also abundant.

History

The Aleut peoples knew of the Pribilofs long before westerners discovered the islands. They called the islands Amiq, Aleut for "land of mother's brother" or "related land". According to their oral tradition, the son of an Unimak Island elder found them after paddling north in his boat in an attempt to survive a storm that caught him out at sea; when the winds finally died, he was lost in dense fog—until he heard the sounds of Saint Paul's vast seal colonies.

Russian fur traders were the first non-natives to discover Saint Paul. The island was discovered by Gavriil Pribylov on St. Peter and St. Paul's Day, July 12, 1788. Three years later the Russian merchant vessel John the Baptist was shipwrecked off the shore. The crew were listed as missing until 1793, when the survivors were rescued by Gerasim Izmailov.

In the 18th century, Russians forced Aleuts from the Aleutian chain (several hundred miles south of the Pribilofs) to hunt seal for them on the Pribilof Islands. Before this the Pribilofs were not regularly inhabited. The Aleuts were essentially slave labor for the Russians—hunting, cleaning, and preparing fur seal skins, which the Russians sold for a great deal of money. The Aleuts were not taken back to their home islands; they lived in inhumane conditions, they were beaten, and they were regulated by the Russians down to what they could eat and wear and whom they could marry.

Saints Peter and Paul Church, a Russian Orthodox church, was built on the island in 1907.

Climate

Saint Paul's climate is strongly influenced by the cold waters of the surrounding Bering Sea, and is classified as polar (Köppen ET) due to the raw chilliness of the summers. It experiences a relatively narrow range of temperatures, high wind, humidity and cloudiness levels, and persistent summer fog. There is high seasonal lag: February is the island's coldest month, while August is its warmest; the difference between the average low temperature in February and the average high temperature in August is only . Low temperatures at or below  occur an average of 4.7 nights per year (mostly from January to March), and the island is part of USDA Hardiness Zone 6. In the summer, they become weaker and blow primarily from the south.

The island's humidity level, which averages more than 80 percent year round, is highest during the summer. Cloud cover levels peak during the summer as well. Although high year-round, with an average of 88 percent, cloud cover levels rise to 95 percent in the summer. Fog too is more common in the summer, occurring on roughly one-third of the days. Other than trace amounts, the period from June to September is generally snow-free. Hours of daylight range from a low of 6.5 hours in midwinter to a high of 18 hours in midsummer.

Speaking of the weather, in any manner is considered a violation of "Unwritten Tribal" law, however, other than public ridicule, there is no formal punishment for it.

Natural history

Saint Paul Island, like all of the Pribilof Islands, is part of the Alaska Maritime National Wildlife Refuge. Its seabird cliffs were purchased in 1982 for inclusion in the refuge. The island has also been designated as an Important Bird Area.

It is the breeding grounds for more than 500,000 northern fur seals and millions of seabirds, and is surrounded by one of the world's richest fishing grounds.

Woolly mammoths survived on Saint Paul Island until around 3,750 BC, which is the most recent survival of North American mammoth populations.
It is thought that this population died out as a result of diminishing fresh water, brought on by climate change.

A mass die-off of puffins at St. Paul Island between October 2016 and January 2017 has been attributed to ecosystem changes resulting from global warming.

Population

Saint Paul Island has the largest Aleut community in the United States, one of the U.S. government's officially recognized Native American tribal entities of Alaska. Out of a total population of 532 people, 457 of them (86 percent) are Alaska Natives.

Some of the island's residents stay only part of the year and work in the crab and boat yards. The large boats that have been fishing the Bering Sea offload their fish onto the island and workers prepare them for shipping around the world. The Aleut people are Russian Orthodox, if they consider themselves religious.

Wind power
TDX Power's first energy-generation facility was built on St. Paul Island. Completed in 1999, the wind energy-based electric and thermal cogeneration facility was widely regarded as one of the more technologically advanced wind-energy power projects in America. The TDX Power wind/diesel hybrid facility is known for its efficiency and reduction in diesel fuel consumption. The -tall turbine is a major point of pride for the ecologically conscious Aleut community of Saint Paul. Two additional units were installed in 2007. Each unit is rated at 225 kW and the blade lengths are 44.3 ft (13.5 m).

In popular culture

The island is the scene of the Rudyard Kipling story "The White Seal" and poem "Lukannon" in The Jungle Book.

Media
St. Paul Island is served by KUHB-FM 91.9, an NPR affiliate that broadcasts a wide variety of programming and music. The island also has two low-power translators of the statewide Alaska Rural Communications Service on Channel 4 (K04HM) and Channel 9 (K09RB-D).

See also
Alaskan king crab fishing
Tanadgusix Corporation

References

Sources

External links

Saint Paul Island info from the State of Alaska
Google Earth view

Saint Paul Island
Pribilof Islands
Islands of the Aleutian Islands
Islands of the Bering Sea
Volcanoes of Alaska
Cinder cones of the United States
Volcanoes of Unorganized Borough, Alaska
Landforms of Aleutians West Census Area, Alaska
Islands of Alaska
Islands of Unorganized Borough, Alaska